Alex Rousseau (born November 4, 1967) is an American former water polo player. He competed at the 1992 Summer Olympics and the 1996 Summer Olympics. In 2004, he was inducted into the USA Water Polo Hall of Fame.

References

External links
 

1967 births
Living people
American male water polo players
Olympic water polo players of the United States
Water polo players at the 1992 Summer Olympics
Water polo players at the 1996 Summer Olympics
Water polo players from Paris
Pan American Games gold medalists for the United States
Water polo players at the 1995 Pan American Games
Pan American Games medalists in water polo
Medalists at the 1995 Pan American Games
20th-century American people